Stephen J. Pyne (1949–present) is an emeritus professor at Arizona State University, specializing in environmental history, the history of exploration, and especially the history of fire.

Education
Pyne received his bachelor's degree at Stanford University after graduating from Brophy College Preparatory, a Jesuit high school, in Phoenix, Arizona. He later attained his master's (1974) and Ph.D. degrees (1976) at the University of Texas at Austin, receiving a MacArthur Fellowship in 1988. He also received a Fulbright Fellowship to Sweden, was awarded two National Endowment for the Humanities Fellowships, and had two tours at the National Humanities Center. He was a professor at Arizona State University from 1985 to 2018.

Pyne spent fifteen seasons as a wildland firefighter at the North Rim of Grand Canyon National Park between 1967 and 1981. He later spent the summers of 1983–85 writing fire plans for Rocky Mountain and Yellowstone national parks.

Career and research 
Many of Pyne's works recount the history of exploration. These writings include his biography of G.K. Gilbert, The Ice, How the Canyon Became Grand, and Voyager. Other works include The Last Lost World, which he wrote with his daughter, Lydia V. Pyne, and two books on writing nonfiction, Voice and Vision and Style and Story.

Since the 1982 publication of his second book, Fire in America, Pyne has become an authority on the history and management of fire, cataloging the fire histories of Australia, Canada, Europe (including Russia), and the overall planet. Pyne has been consulted to rank the severity and destructive effects of historical fires to contextualize recent wildfires intensified by climate change. He has written and co-authored three textbooks on landscape fires and their management. His 2015 book Between Two Fires and nine-volume series To the Last Smoke have summarized America's fire history, arguing that the US Forest Service was formed based on the European ideals of Bernhard Fernow, the third chief of the USDA's Division of Forestry, and it acquired significant government funding after successfully combating the Great Fire of 1910.

Pyne has criticized the proposed Anthropocene epoch as emphasizing a single species' domination over the environment. He instead advocates for a "Pyrocene epoch" defined by humanity's usage of fire, opposite to the Pleistocene epoch's Ice Age. Managed combustion of fossil fuels has supported the industrialization that is causing significant reductions in biodiversity and climate change, while the nuclear weapons testing has increased the soil concentration of trace elements.

Bibliography
Stephen J. Pyne has authored the following books, and his papers are housed in the Arizona State University Archives:
 Grove Karl Gilbert (University of Texas Press, 1980; out of print)
 Fire in America: A Cultural History of Wildland and Rural Fire (1982; paperback edition, University of Washington Press, 1997)
 Dutton's Point: A Natural History of the Grand Canyon (Grand Canyon Natural History Association, 1983; out of print)
 Introduction to Wildland Fire: Fire Management in the United States (New York: Wiley, 1984; out of print)
 The Ice: A Journey to Antarctica (1986; paperback edition, University of Washington Press, 1998)
 Wildland Fires and Nuclear Winters: Selected Reconstruction of Historic Large Fires. (Defense Documentation Center, DNA-TR-85-396, February 1986), 167 pp, illus, unclassified report to Defense Nuclear Agency. Co-author, Dr Philip N. Omi.
 Fire on the Rim. A Firefighter's Season at the Grand Canyon (1989; Bantam paperback edition, 1990; University of Washington Press paperback edition, 1995)
 Burning Bush. A Fire History of Australia (1991; paperback edition, University of Washington Press, 1998)
 World Fire. The Culture of Fire on Earth (Henry Holt and Co., 1995; paperback edition, University of Washington Press, 1997; Japanese edition, Hosei University Press, 2001)
 Introduction to Wildland Fire, 2nd ed. (New York: Wiley, 1996). Co-authors: Patricia Andrews and Richard Laven.
 America's Fires. Management in Wildlands and Forests (Durham: Forest History Society, 1997)
 How the Canyon Became Grand: A Short History (Viking, 1998; Penguin Books, pb edition, 1999)
 Vestal Fire. An Environmental History, Told Through Fire, of Europe and Europe's Encounter with the World (1997; paperback edition, University of Washington Press, 2000)
 Fire: A Brief History (University of Washington Press and British Museum, 2001)
 Year of the Fires: The Story of the Great Fires of 1910 (New York: Viking, 2001; Penguin, pb edition, 2002)
 Smokechasing (Tucson: University of Arizona Press, 2003)
 Tending Fire: Coping With America's Wildfires (Island Press, 2004)
 Brittlebush Valley (Patsons Press, 2005)
 The Still-Burning Bush (Scribe Publications, 2006)
 Awful Splendour: A Fire History of Canada (University of British Columbia Press, 2007)
 Voice and Vision: A Guide to Writing History and Other Serious Nonfiction (Harvard University Press, 2009)
 America's Fires. A Historical Context for Policy and Practice (Forest History Society, 2010)
 Voyager: seeking newer worlds in the third great age of discovery (Viking, 2010)
 The Last Lost World: Ice Ages, Human Origins, and the Invention of the Pleistocene (Viking Penguin, 2012). Co-author: Lydia V. Pyne.
 Fire: Nature and Culture (Reaktion Books, 2012)
 Fire on Earth: An Introduction (Wiley Blackwell, 2013). Co-authors: Andrew Scott, William Bond, David Bowman, M.E. Alexander
 Between Two Fires: A Fire History of Contemporary America (University of Arizona Press, 2015)
 To the Last Smoke Vol. 1 Florida, Vol. 2 California, Vol. 3 Northern Rockies, Vol. 4 Southwest, Vol. 5 Great Plains, Vol. 6 The Interior West, Vol. 7 The Northeast, Vol. 8 Slopovers: Oak Woodlands, Pacific Northwest, and Alaska, and Vol. 9 Here and There. (University of Arizona Press, 2016–2018)
 Style and Story. Literary Methods for Writing Nonfiction (University of Arizona Press, 2018)

See also
 Wildfire

References

External links
 Pyne's Website
 How fire shapes everything | Stephen Pyne - TED Archive

Wildfire suppression
Stanford University alumni
University of Texas at Austin College of Liberal Arts alumni
Arizona State University faculty
Living people
MacArthur Fellows
Grand Canyon history
Environmental historians
Year of birth missing (living people)
Presidents of the American Society for Environmental History